Canale 5 is an Italian free-to-air television channel of Mediaset, owned by MFE - MediaForEurope. It was the first private television network to have a national coverage in Italy in 1980.
On 4 December 2012, Mediaset launched Canale 5 HD, a simulcast of Canale 5 in high-definition. Since January 2013, Canale 5 has been directed by Giancarlo Scheri.

History
In 1978, Telemilano, a local Milan-based broadcaster became Canale 5 two years later and began broadcasting nationally. Canale 5 was subsequently joined by Italia 1 (in 1982) and Rete 4 (in 1984).

2000s 
Since 2003, the channel is also free of charge in digital terrestrial areas in areas covered by Mediaset 2 and Mediaset 4 mux, and from 26 November 2010 also in the areas covered by the Mediaset 6 mux through the deferred version of one hour Canale 5 +1, Transferred from 11 July 2011 on mux Mediaset 5.

It was also available until 11 July 2011, in high definition (though forced) Canale 5 HD in regions where transition to digital terrestrial switch-off occurred and reached by mux Mediaset 6. From the end of July the high definition channel Has been re-activated on mux Mediaset 6 and is only visible in Sardinia.

Anyone who has a set top box or MHP (Multimedia Home Platform) television can enjoy the interactive features included in the broadcaster's signal (interactive TV), called Canale 5 Plus.

On 12 May 2009, with the movie Remembered for Me, for the first time, Canale 5 broadcast at 16:9; Transmissions and new format are made exclusively via the digital terrestrial signal. From 1 November of the same year, the advertising space, promo and bumper of the Mediaset networks are also broadcast.

On analogue television (with a definitive broadcast date on 4 July 2012) and on satellite signal (until 18 July 2012), the events were transmitted in 4: 3 format with letterbox format. Furthermore, the original language of the digital terrestrial audio track was not and still is not possible.

Since 1 October 2009, in the satellite broadcast, Canale 5's entire programming has been coded in Mediaguard 2 (a system used previously for service by Mediaset networks to encrypt foreign broadcasts) and Nagravision: Full use of the issuer is only possible using a Tivùsat smart card.

Mediaset always has Hotbird 13 ° E of service frequencies to power terrestrial DTT / DVB-H repeaters (transmitted in a professional mode with dedicated equipment, so it can not be tuned by the end user) only sporadically in case of testing you can receive from the standard DVB-S2 decoders. In these frequencies there are all Mediaset channels present on digital terrestrial, but still encrypted on satellite.

To continue providing service to non-card users, a second satellite frequency has been activated from the same date (the channel identifier is capitalized) on which you can continue to receive the signal clear: Which do not hold foreigners' rights, however, are obscured by an information notice where users are invited to have a Tivùsat decoder.

On 19 September 2012, Canale 5 proposed the first Champions League match in HD on 506 of terrestrial television channel on Mediaset HD, which temporarily replaced the high definition version of Italia 1.

On 5 December 2012, Canale 5 HD was activated on mux La3 visible throughout Italy with the exception of northwestern Tuscany, where Monte Serra transmitting center has switched off the multiplex for interference

Programming
Canale 5 proposes principally internal productions, including:

 TG5, newscast.
 Amici di Maria De Filippi, talent show with Maria de Filippi.
 Avanti un altro!, game show with Paolo Bonolis.
 Caduta libera (Italian version of La'uf al HaMillion, game show) with Gerry Scotti.
 C'è posta per Te, people show with Maria de Filippi.
 Forum, judicial show with Barbara Palombelli.
 Mattino Cinque, news show with Federica Panicucci and Francesco Vecchi.
 Pomeriggio Cinque, news show with Barbara d'Urso
 Tu si que vales, talent show.
 Uomini e donne, reality show and talk show with Maria de Filippi
Striscia la notizia
 New Amsterdam

The channel airs movies and soap-opera, including Acacias 38 and The Baker and the Beauty.

Like Rai 1, the Holy Mass is transmitted on Sundays at 10.00 AM.

Services

Canale 5 Plus

It is the channel's interactive television service on DTT. It provides access to current news, weather forecasts, programming guides and games coded in Mhp.

In 2006, during the summer an app was launched that the users to watch Mediaset's archive television series such as Odiens, La sai l'ultima? and Il pranzo è servito.

Logos
The current logo of the network is a 5 overlapped by the stylized head of Biscione (reference to the Visconti family and the city of Milan), from whose mouth, unlike the original, comes out a flower. There is also a second interpretation, according to which the queue of the Biscione is placed at five (even if the 5 is written with a typographical font).

The first promotional slogan of Canale 5 was: Corri a casa in tutta fretta, c'è un Biscione che ti aspetta. The biscione logo is in use (albeit through various graphic restyling) ever since 1974 since the network was called Tele Milano. It is still today in the main brand of the Mediaset company and its ramifications.

Management

Announcers

In the past, Canale 5 had a mistress good evening.

The first announcer of the network was Eleonora Brigliadori, who was active from September 1980 to May 1984.

After that, Fiorella Pierobon, who was the longest advertiser of the network, was active for 19 years, from May 1984 to June 2003 (previously Pierobon was Italia 1's announcer).

In June 2003, Pierobon, reporting directly to Striscia la notizia, announced that he would leave the role as Miss Goodnight to engage in other projects. Pierobon was replaced (after a long selection in the 2003 Velone Summer Program) by Lisa Gritti, who was active for a little more than a year, from September 2003 to December 2005, before the position was abandoned following a scandal, which stripped the Striscia la notizia, where the announcer was also involved.

After the resignation of the Gritti, the network decided to forgo this figure (as was the case with Italia 1 in 2002, after the abandonment of Gabriella Golia).

Other announcers of Canale 5 (for short periods) have been: Fabrizia Carminati, Alba Parietti, Paola Perego, Susanna Messaggio, Michela Rocco of Torrepadula, and Daniela Castelli. Among the announcers of Canale 5 were also Barbara d'Urso, who at the end of the seventies was Miss Telemilano 58, tonight; the local television broadcaster later transformed into Canale 5.

The background music of the advertisements used from 1980 to 1993 was composed by Augusto Martelli, whereas the accompanying advertisement music used from 1993 to 2005 was composed by Alessandro Radici. The first background music jingle was never officially released by RTI, whereas the second jingle (the full version being 1 minute and 33 seconds long), was released for digital download from Mediaset, MusicShop.

Audience

Audience share 
Below, monthly audience issued by AUDITEL.

Average Monthly Day on Target Individuals 4+

See also
 Mediaset
 Rete 4
 Italia 1
 Italia 2

References

Bibliography

External links
 Official Site 
 Old official site (1996)

Mediaset television channels
Television channels and stations established in 1980
Italian-language television stations